Wedding cabbage ( / svadbarski kupus) is traditional Serbian dish. The main ingredients are cabbage and a meat, which could be pork, bacon, or lamb and mutton.  This dish is typically prepared by cooking it slowly for many hours in a big crock.  It is traditionally served at weddings and other major events.

Preparation 
Cabbage is sliced into small cubes. In the crock bacon, cabbage and meat are layered. Water is then added until it covers everything, after which it's brought to a boil and left to simmer for a few hours.

Cabbage festival 
Cabbage festival is held annually in Mrčajevci, where a wedding cabbage competition is held. The winner receives a golden pot, and the runner-up receives a silver pot. In 2012, the festival was attended by more than 100,000 visitors in a three-day span.

See also
 List of cabbage dishes
 Podvarak

References 

Serbian cuisine
Cabbage dishes